Hananiah, Hanina, Chaninah, Haninah, Chananiah or Ananias may refer to:

Hebrew Bible
 Hananiah ben Zerubbabel, (Old Testament: Chronicles)
 Hananiah (aka Shadrach) of Shadrach, Meshach, and Abednego
 Hananiah (Samaritan), 4th century BC, governor of Samaria under the Achaemenid Empire
 Hananiah ben Azzur, a false prophet mentioned in Jeremiah 28

Rabbis
 Hanina Segan ha-Kohanim first generation Tanna
 Hanina, third generation Amora the Land of Israel
 Hanina bar Hama (d. 250)
 Haninah, or Chaninah, 2nd century AD Rabbinic sage, contemporary of Judah ben Bathyra and Jonathan
 Hanina ben Hakinai, 2nd century AD Rabbinic sage, contemporary of Ben 'Azzai and Simon the Temanite
 Haninah ben Teradion, 2nd century AD Rabbinic sage, contemporary of Eleazar ben Perata I and Halafta
 Hanina of Sura 5th generation Amora 
 Hanina of Sepphoris

Hellenistic

 Ananias ben Onias, son of the priest who founded the Jewish Temple at Leontopolis
 Hananiah of Damascus, known as Ananias of Damascus, Hellenized Jewish mystic, mentioned in the Acts of the Apostles as a convert to Christianity and early companion of Saul of Tarsus

Modern era
A personal name, including:
Hananiah Harari (1912–2000), American painter and illustrator
Hanania Baer, award-winning cinematographer

See also 
 Ananiah
 Hanani

Hebrew masculine given names

he:חנינא